Fantasma d'amore is a 1981 drama film directed by Dino Risi that stars Romy Schneider and Marcello Mastroianni.

Plot
Nino, a married tax accountant, sees on a bus Anna, the woman he loved 20 years ago, now poor and ill. After he gives her money for her fare, she hops off and disappears. That night she rings him at his home to say she can repay him and he goes to the dingy address she gives, where he takes the money and she again disappears. Later it emerges that the concierge has been bloodily murdered.

To the dismay of his wife, he becomes obsessed with Anna, seeing flashbacks of her when young and beautiful and trying to meet her again. After a doctor friend of his who knew her says she died three years ago, he is found dead at the hospital where he worked. She rings him to say he can visit her at a mansion in the country. To his joy, the young Anna welcomes him, but will not let him make love since she is now married to the owner, Count Zighi. Later, she rings to say they can make love in a boat on the river as they used to do. When he stops the boat in a quiet place, she falls in and disappears under the water.

Nino informs the police, who start searching, and his irate wife leaves him. Going to Count Zighi to explain, he is told by the angry count that Anna died three years ago. This is confirmed by the housekeeper, who takes him to the grave. Going back to the police, he apologises for his story and says he was in fact with a prostitute. They say that a body has been found, but it is a man who was on the river bank.

The film ends in the grounds of a nursing home, where a shapely nurse comes to bring Nino indoors. When we see her face, it is the young Anna.

Cast
 Romy Schneider as Anna Brigatti Zighi
 Marcello Mastroianni as Nino Monti
 Eva Maria Meineke as Teresa Monti
 Wolfgang Preiss as Conte Zighi
 Michael Kroecher as Don Gaspare
 Paolo Baroni as Ressi
 Victoria Zinny as Loredana
 Giampiero Becherelli as Prof. Arnaldi
 Ester Carloni
 Riccardo Parisio Perrotti
 Raf Baldassarre as Luciano
 Maria Simona Peruzzi
 Liliana Pacinotti
 Adriana Giuffrè

Production
Fantasma d'amore was shot on location in Pavia and Cine Industrial Studios in Rome. The film started shooting in October 26, 1980.

Release
Fantasma d'amore was distributed by Ceiad in Italy on 3 April 1981. It was released in France as Fantôme d'amour on 29 April 1981 and in West Germany on 21 May 1982 as Die zwei Gesichter einer Frau. The film was also screened at the 1982 Chicago International Film Festival in October 1982.

See also
 List of Italian films of 1981

Notes

References

External links

1981 films
1981 drama films
Italian drama films
West German films
1980s Italian-language films
Films directed by Dino Risi
Films scored by Riz Ortolani
Films shot in Italy
1980s Italian films